Tamati Ioane (born 26 April 1997) is an Australian rugby union player who plays for the  in Super Rugby. His playing position is flanker or number 8. He was named in the Rebels squad for the 2022 Super Rugby Pacific season.

Super Rugby statistics

Reference list

External links
itsrugby.co.uk profile

Australian rugby union players
Living people
Rugby union flankers
Rugby union number eights
Melbourne Rebels players
1997 births